Scotodes is a genus of beetles belonging to the family Stenotrachelidae.

The species of this genus are found in Europe, Russia and Japan.

Species:
 Scotodes annulatus Eschscholtz, 1818

References

Tenebrionoidea